Robert Michael Emerson (born July 30, 1981) is an American professional mixed martial artist. A professional competitor since 2002, Emerson is also a veteran of Bellator MMA, the UFC, Pancrase, and was a cast member of The Ultimate Fighter 5.

Background
Emerson was born in Huntington Beach, California and grew up in Dana Point, California. He started training Kyokushin Karate at the age of nine and picked up also Kajukenbo later. Being severely bullied in the school for his Tourettes, Emerson got into lots of fights in his juvenile years. While preparing to embark on a military career, Emerson went to an unsanctioned mixed martial arts show and ended up fighting there, kindling a fire to pursue a career in the sport.

Mixed martial arts career

Early career
After being released from jail in 2002, Emerson made his professional debut against Jens Pulver at an Ultimate Wrestling event on June 29, 2002. He lost the bout via unanimous decision.

The Ultimate Fighter
According to Emerson, he bypassed the tryouts as he was invited to participate directly to The Ultimate Fighter 5. On episode three of the season, Emerson faced eventual winner of the show, Nate Diaz. In the second round of an exciting, back-and-forth fight, Diaz managed to secure a rear naked choke for the win. However, BJ Penn told the viewers that he could not take anything away from Emerson, as he had given the fight his all. After Gabe Ruediger was taken off the show for his inability to make the 155 lb weight limit Dana White brought Emerson back. Corey Hill, Ruediger's initial opponent, picked him to fight.

The first round belonged to Hill as Emerson had problems getting inside and dealing with his substantial reach advantage. In the second round, Emerson was able to take a shot at Hill and get out of range effectively. He even locked in a heel hook when the action hit the mat, earning him the round and forcing the bout to a third and deciding stanza. In the third, both fighters spent most of their time circling each other, and while Emerson appeared to score the most effective blows of the round with kicks to the leg, the decision went to Hill, who put Team Pulver back in the win column and in control heading into episode seven.

Ultimate Fighting Championship
Emerson faced fellow Team Penn teammate, Gray Maynard, on the undercard of The Ultimate Fighter 5 Finale. Maynard dominated in the first round (the only effective work of Emerson's being a flying knee and a takedown). The second round began with Gray picking up Emerson and slamming him to the canvas. Due to an aggravated injury of the ribs, Emerson submitted. During the fall, however, Maynard accidentally spiked himself on the floor and seemingly rendered himself unconscious. The bout was declared a no-contest. 

In his next fight at UFC 81, Emerson won a split decision over Keita Nakamura. Nakamura dropped Emerson with a knee at the end of the first round after Emerson had outstruck him for much of the round. Emerson came back strong in the second round, landing crisp combinations that left Nakamura's face a mess. Nakamura scored takedowns in the third round on a visibly tiring Emerson, but it was not enough to win him the split decision as the scores read (30–27, 28–29, and 30–27) in favor of Emerson.

At UFC 87, Emerson knocked out Manvel Gamburyan in only 12 seconds, earning him "Knockout of the Night" honors.

His next fight at UFC Fight Night: Lauzon vs. Stephens was against Kurt Pellegrino. Emerson lost the fight at 3:14 of the second round due to submission (rear naked choke); the first submission loss of Emerson's professional career.

Emerson was scheduled to fight George Sotiropoulos at UFC 101 but was forced to withdraw because of a hand injury and was replaced by George Roop.

Emerson lost at UFC 103 by decision to Rafael dos Anjos on September 19, 2009. He agreed to the contest after Matt Wiman was forced to withdraw after suffering a knee injury.

Emerson next faced Phillipe Nover on February 6, 2010, at UFC 109 and won a unanimous decision.

Emerson faced Nik Lentz at UFC Fight Night 21. He lost via unanimous decision and was released from his UFC contract.

Independent promotions
Emerson defeated Rodney Rhoden by TKO in round one at Pure Combat 12.

Emerson faced Eric Reynolds at AOF 10 on December 4, 2010. He won the fight via split decision.

Emerson fought Justin Salas at Full Force Fighting: Vol. 1 on January 29, 2011. Emerson lost to Salas via unanimous decision.

Emerson defeated WEC Veteran Savant Young at Tachi Palace Fighting 12: Second Coming via rear-naked choke submission in round three.

Emerson defeated Jason Williams at FCOC: Fight Club OC via rear naked choke. Following this, he fought at the next Fight Club OC event, defeating Musa Toliver by triangle choke.

Bellator MMA
Emerson was expected to face Patricio Freire at Bellator 97 on July 31, 2013, when he would make his Featherweight and Bellator Debut. However, on July 12, 2013, it was announced that Emerson would withdraw due to injury and was replaced by Jared Downing.

Emerson eventually would make his Bellator debut against Jared Downing on October 18, 2013 at Bellator 104. He won the fight via heel hook submission in the first round.

Emerson made his Bantamweight debut against Joe Taimanglo on April 11, 2014 at Bellator 116. He won via unanimous decision.

Emerson faced Rafael Silva at Bellator 127 on October 3, 2014. He lost the fight via unanimous decision. Subsequently, California State Athletic Commission suspended Emerson for 18 months after testing positive for prescription drug Modafinil. The suspension was then reduced to five months.

Regional circuit
After his stint in Bellator, Emerson signed with Victory FC where he became both Bantamweight and Featherweight champion in his first two fights, respectively. He lost his Bantamweight Championship before signing with Russian promotion Absolute Championship Akhmat where he eventually racked a 1–2 record.

Emerson was next scheduled to face Charles Bennett in a bare-knuckle MMA bout at Gamebred FC 2 on September 11, 2021. However, the event would be rescheduled for October 1, 2021. Emerson won by knockout in the first round.

Championships and accomplishments
Ultimate Fighting Championship
Fight of the Night (One time) vs. Gray Maynard 
Knockout of the Night (One time) vs. Manny Gamburyan 
Victory Fighting Championship
VFC Bantamweight Championship (One time; former)
VFC Featherweight Championship (One time; current)

Mixed martial arts record

|-
|Win
|align=center| 21–15 (1)
|Charles Bennett 
|KO (punches) 
|Gamebred FC 2
|
|align=center|1
|align=center|4:36
|Biloxi, Mississippi, United States 
|   
|-
|-
|Loss
|align=center| 20–15 (1)
|Dileno Lopes
|Submission (Guillotine Choke)
|ACA 101: Strus vs. Nemchinov
|
|align=center|1
|align=center|3:00
|Warsaw, Poland
|  
|-
| Loss
| align=center| 20–14 (1)
| Mikhail Malyutin
| Decision (unanimous)
| |ACA 93: Balaev vs Zhamaldaev 
| 
| align=center| 3
| align=center| 5:00
| St. Petersburg, Russia
|
|-
| Loss
| align=center| 20–13 (1)
| Magomedrasul Khasbulaev
| Submission (rear-naked choke) 
| WFCA 54: Dudaev vs. Taimanglo 
| 
| align=center| 2
| align=center| 1:57
| Isa Town, Bahrain 
|
|-
| Win
| align=center| 20–12 (1)
| Shamil Shakhbulatov
| Decision (unanimous)
| |ACB 87: Whiteford vs Mousah 
| 
| align=center| 3
| align=center| 5:00
| Nottingham, England
|
|-
| Loss
| align=center| 19–12 (1)
| Raufeon Stots
| Decision (unanimous)
| VFC 56
| 
| align=center|5
| align=center|5:00
| Omaha, Nebraska, United States
| 
|-
| Win
| align=center| 19–11 (1)
| Ryan Roberts
| TKO (knee injury)
| VFC 54
| 
| align=center|1
| align=center|1:34
| Omaha, Nebraska, United States
| 
|-
| Win
| align=center| 18–11 (1)
| Shawn West
| Submission (rear-naked choke)
| VFC 51
| 
| align=center|3
| align=center|5:00
| Urbandale, Iowa, United States
| 
|-
| Loss
| align=center| 17–11 (1)
| Rafael Silva
| Decision (unanimous)
| Bellator 127
| 
| align=center|3
| align=center|5:00
| Temecula, California, United States
|
|-
| Win
| align=center| 17–10 (1)
| Joe Taimanglo
| Decision (unanimous)
| Bellator 116
| 
| align=center|3
| align=center|5:00 
| Temecula, California, United States
|
|-
| Win
| align=center| 16–10 (1)
| Jared Downing
| Submission (inverted heel hook)
| Bellator 104
| 
| align=center| 1
| align=center| 1:44
| Cedar Rapids, Iowa, United States
|
|-
| Win
| align=center| 15–10 (1)
| Musa Toliver
| Submission (triangle choke)
| FCOC: Fight Club OC
| 
| align=center| 1
| align=center| 4:20
|Costa Mesa, California, United States
|
|-
| Win
| align=center| 14–10 (1)
| Jason Williams
| Submission (rear-naked choke)
| FCOC: Fight Club OC
| 
| align=center| 1
| align=center| 2:05
| Costa Mesa, California, United States
| 
|-
| Win
| align=center| 13–10 (1)
| Savant Young
| Submission (rear-naked choke)
| TPF 12: Second Coming
| 
| align=center| 3
| align=center| 4:29
| Lemoore, California, United States
| 
|-
| Loss
| align=center| 12–10 (1)
| Justin Salas
| Decision (unanimous)
| Full Force Fighting: Vol. 1
| 
| align=center| 3
| align=center| 5:00
| Denver, Colorado, United States
| 
|-
| Win
| align=center| 12–9 (1)
| Eric Reynolds
| Decision (split)
| Art of Fighting 10
| 
| align=center| 3
| align=center| 5:00
| Estero, Florida, United States
| 
|-
| Win
| align=center| 11–9 (1)
| Rodney Rhoden
| TKO (punches)
| Pure Combat 12: Champions for Children
| 
| align=center| 1
| align=center| 3:33
| Clovis, California, United States
| 
|-
| Loss
| align=center| 10–9 (1)
| Nik Lentz
| Decision (unanimous)
| UFC Fight Night: Florian vs. Gomi
| 
| align=center| 3
| align=center| 5:00
| Charlotte, North Carolina, United States
| 
|-
| Win
| align=center| 10–8 (1)
| Phillipe Nover
| Decision (unanimous)
| UFC 109
| 
| align=center| 3
| align=center| 5:00
| Las Vegas, Nevada, United States
| 
|-
| Loss
| align=center| 9–8 (1)
| Rafael dos Anjos
| Decision (unanimous)
| UFC 103
| 
| align=center| 3
| align=center| 5:00
| Dallas, Texas, United States
| 
|-
| Loss
| align=center| 9–7 (1)
| Kurt Pellegrino
| Submission (rear-naked choke)
| UFC Fight Night: Lauzon vs. Stephens
| 
| align=center| 2
| align=center| 3:14
| Tampa, Florida, United States
| 
|-
| Win
| align=center| 9–6 (1)
| Manvel Gamburyan
| KO (punches)
| UFC 87
| 
| align=center| 1
| align=center| 0:12
| Minneapolis, Minnesota, United States
| 
|-
| Win
| align=center| 8–6 (1)
| Keita Nakamura
| Decision (split)
| UFC 81
| 
| align=center| 3
| align=center| 5:00
| Las Vegas, Nevada, United States
| 
|-
| NC
| align=center| 7–6 (1)
| Gray Maynard
| NC (double KO due to slam)
| The Ultimate Fighter 5 Finale
| 
| align=center| 2
| align=center| 0:39
| Las Vegas, Nevada, United States
| 
|-
| Win
| align=center| 7–6
| Kenji Arai
| Decision (unanimous)
| Pancrase: Blow 6
| 
| align=center| 3
| align=center| 5:00
| Yokohama, Japan
| 
|-
| Win
| align=center| 6–6
| Takafumi Ito
| Decision (unanimous)
|Pancrase: Blow 4
| 
| align=center| 3
| align=center| 5:00
| Tokyo, Japan
| 
|-
| Win
| align=center| 5–6
| Jamie Schmidt
| TKO (punches)
| TC 13: Anarchy
| 
| align=center| 2
| align=center| 1:02
| Del Mar, California, United States
| 
|-
| Win
| align=center| 4–6
| Julian Samaniego
| TKO (punches)
| KOTC 61: Flash Point
| 
| align=center| 1
| align=center| 2:15
| San Jacinto, California, United States
| 
|-
| Loss
| align=center| 3–6
| Melvin Guillard
| Decision (split)
| RCF: Cold Hearted
| 
| align=center| 3
| align=center| 5:00
| Biloxi, Mississippi, United States
| 
|-
| Loss
| align=center| 3–5
| Randy Velarde
| Decision (majority)
| KOTC 44: Revenge
| 
| align=center| 2
| align=center| 5:00
| San Jacinto, California, United States
| 
|-
| Win
| align=center| 3–4
| Joe Camacho
| Decision (unanimous)
| KOTC 41: Relentless
| 
| align=center| 2
| align=center| 5:00
| San Jacinto, California, United States
| 
|-
| Win
| align=center| 2–4
| Justin Berkley
| Submission (arm-triangle choke)
| TC 3: Total Combat 3
| 
| align=center| 2
| align=center| N/A
| Tijuana, Baja California, Mexico
| 
|-
| Loss
| align=center| 1–4
| Dokonjonosuke Mishima
| Decision (unanimous)
| Deep: 14th Impact
| 
| align=center| 3
| align=center| 5:00
| Osaka, Japan
| 
|-
| Loss
| align=center| 1–3
| Javier Vazquez
| Decision (split)
| Shooto USA: Warrior Spirit: Evolution
| 
| align=center| 3
| align=center| 5:00
| Las Vegas, Nevada, United States
|  
|-
| Win
| align=center| 1–2
| Chris Brennan
| Submission (achilles lock)
| Hitman Fighting 3
| 
| align=center| N/A
| align=center| N/A
| Santa Ana, California, United States
| 
|-
| Loss
| align=center| 0–2
| Jamal Perkins
| Decision (unanimous)
| KOTC 19: Street Fighter
| 
| align=center| 2
| align=center| 5:00
| San Jacinto, California, United States
| 
|-
| Loss
| align=center| 0–1
| Jens Pulver
| Decision (unanimous)
| UW: Ultimate Wrestling
| 
| align=center| 3
| align=center| 5:00
| Minneapolis, Minnesota, United States
|

See also
 List of Bellator MMA alumni

References

External links
 
 

American male mixed martial artists
Mixed martial artists utilizing Kyokushin kaikan
Mixed martial artists from California
Lightweight mixed martial artists
1981 births
Living people
Sportspeople from Newport Beach, California
Featherweight mixed martial artists
Bantamweight mixed martial artists
People from Irvine, California
American male karateka
Ultimate Fighting Championship male fighters